The 2008 Michigan Republican presidential primary took place on January 15, 2008. Mitt Romney came in first with 39 percent of the vote, followed by John McCain with 30 percent and Mike Huckabee in third-place with 16 percent. The victory was widely viewed as critical for the Romney campaign, as a loss in Michigan, where his father was governor, would have resulted in a loss of momentum after two losses already in New Hampshire and Iowa.

National delegates determined: 30 out of 60

In accordance with Republican National Committee rules, Michigan was stripped of half its delegates for holding primary contests before February 5, 2008.

Candidates
 Former Mayor Rudy Giuliani of New York City
 Former Governor Mike Huckabee of Arkansas
 Congressman Duncan Hunter of California
 Senator John McCain of Arizona
 Congressman Ron Paul of Texas
 Former Governor Mitt Romney of Massachusetts
 Former Senator Fred Thompson of Tennessee

Withdrawn
 Senator Sam Brownback of Kansas
 Congressman Tom Tancredo of Colorado

Results
15 statewide delegates were awarded proportionally to candidates who got 15% or more of the vote. Each of the state's 15 congressional districts received 1 delegate, which was awarded to the candidate who got the most votes in that district.

See also
 2008 Michigan Democratic presidential primary
 2008 Republican Party presidential primaries

References

Michigan
United States president Republican
Republican Party (United States) events in Michigan
Michigan Republican primaries